The men's tournament of the 2014 Canadian Senior Curling Championships was held from March 22 to 29 at the Yellowknife Community Arena and the Yellowknife Curling Centre in Yellowknife, Northwest Territories.

Qualifying round
Four associations did not automatically qualify to the championships, and participated in a qualifying round. Two qualification spots were awarded to the winners of the double knockout round, Yukon and Northern Ontario.

Teams
The teams are listed as follows:

Knockout Brackets

Teams
The teams are listed as follows:

Round-robin standings
Final round-robin standings

Round-robin results
All times listed are in Mountain Standard Time (UTC−7).

Draw 2
Saturday, March 22, 7:00 pm

Draw 3
Sunday, March 23, 9:00 am

Draw 4
Sunday, March 23, 2:00 pm

Draw 5
Sunday, March 23, 7:00 pm

Draw 6
Monday, March 24, 9:00 am

Draw 7
Monday, March 24, 2:00 pm

Draw 8
Monday, March 24, 7:00 pm

Draw 9
Tuesday, March 25, 9:00 am

Draw 10
Tuesday, March 25, 2:00 pm

Draw 11
Tuesday, March 25, 7:00 pm

Draw 12
Wednesday, March 26, 9:00 am

Draw 13
Wednesday, March 26, 2:00 pm

Draw 14
Wednesday, March 26, 7:00 pm

Draw 15
Thursday, March 27, 9:00 am

Draw 16
Thursday, March 27, 2:00 pm

Draw 17
Thursday, March 27, 7:00 pm

Tiebreaker
Friday, March 28, 1:30 pm

Playoffs

Semifinal
Friday, March 28, 6:30 pm

Final
Saturday, March 29, 2:30 pm

References

External links

2014 in Canadian curling
Canadian Senior Curling Championships